A list of films produced by the Israeli film industry released in 2011.

Notable deaths

 January 3 – Yosef Shiloach, Israeli actor - cancer.
 April 4 - Juliano Mer-Khamis, Israeli actor, director, filmmaker and political activist of Jewish and Christian Arab parentage - shot

See also
2011 in Israel

References

External links
 Israeli films of 2011 at the Internet Movie Database

Israeli
Film
2011